Grim Church is a parish church of the Church of Norway in Kristiansand Municipality in Agder county, Norway. It is located in the borough of Grim in the city of Kristiansand, just northwest of the city centre. It is the church for the Grim parish which is part of the Kristiansand domprosti (arch-deanery) in the Diocese of Agder og Telemark. The gray, concrete church was built in a long church design in 1969 using plans drawn up by the architect Alv Erikstad who was the city architect at that time. The church seats about 385 people.

Media gallery

See also
List of churches in Agder og Telemark

References

Churches in Kristiansand
20th-century Church of Norway church buildings
Churches completed in 1969
1969 establishments in Norway